The La Chi people (also Cù Tê or La Quả) live in the Hà Giang and Lào Cai provinces of northeastern Vietnam. Their population is 15,126 people (2019). They speak the Lachi language, which is part of the Tai–Kadai language group.

Their ancestor is Hoàng Dìn Thùng. They put aside the most fertilized field for growing cotton plant and strobilanthes flaccidifolius nees plant. They sing ní ca and celebrate the Khu Cù Tê Festival in 7th month of the lunar year.

Names
Lachi groups call themselves by various names, including the following (Hoang 2012:13).
Cù Tè
Ý Pi
Ý Tó
Ý Poong
Ý Mia

Other groups call the Lachi (Hoang 2012:13):
Black Thổ
Mán La Chí
Xá

References 

Hoàng Thanh Lịch. 2012. Người La Chí ở Việt Nam / The La Chi in Vietnam. Hà Nội: Nhà xuất bản thông tấn.

External links 
Ethnologue entry

Ethnic groups in Vietnam